This is a list of members of the Victorian Legislative Council at the election of 6 June 1913, up to the election of 1 June 1916. As half of the Legislative Council's terms expired at each triennial election, half of these members were elected at the 1910 triennial election with terms expiring in 1916, while the other half were elected at the 1913 triennial election with terms expiring in 1919.

The Electoral Provinces Boundaries Act 1903 defined 17 Provinces with two members each for a total of 34 members.

Note the "Term in Office" refers to that members term(s) in the Council, not necessarily for that Province.

John Mark Davies was President; Arthur Sachse was Chairman of Committees.

 Evans died 22 August 1914; replaced by William Beckett in September 1914.
 Fielding died 14 April 1916; replaced by Arthur Disney in May 1916.
 Little resigned in April 1916; replaced by William Kendell in May 1916.

References

 Re-member (a database of all Victorian MPs since 1851). Parliament of Victoria.

Members of the Parliament of Victoria by term
20th-century Australian politicians